Chadsey Lake, also known as Lost Lake, is located on Sumas Mountain near Abbotsford, British Columbia.

Name
Chadsey Creek flows into the lake and was named in 1939, after pioneer William Harvey Chadsey, son of William Chadsey and Mary Jane Town (One undated provincial reference map marks it as "Lost Creek").

Chadsey died at Chilliwack General Hospital on July 16, 1940 at age 73. He was the third of four brothers who farmed in the area in the last half of the 19th Century.

Location
The lake is in the north part of Sumas Mountain Regional Park, on the north-facing slope of Sumas Mountain.

From the starting point at Batt Road, it is about a 5 km hike to the lake.  In the middle of the lake, there is an island.

By Batt Road there is a motor biking trail. Then there is a small hill where people climb and enter the wooded area leading to the lake.

References

External links
 Fraser Valley Regional District Parks: Sumas Mountain

Lakes of the Lower Mainland
New Westminster Land District